Govt First Grade College Ankola was established on October 15, 1750 in Ankola, India. The college's name was changed to Poojageri. The college is a public institution in the Uttara Kannada District. The Principal is S.V. Nayak. The college offers B.A, B.Com, B.Sc, B.B.A, and M.A in economics courses. GFGC Ankola comes under the Kud Department. It has about 600 students.

History
Govt First College Ankola was established in 2007 near Satyagraha Smarka Bhavan in Ankola's downtown. Later, GFGC moved to Poojageri. The college is accredited by the National Assessment and Accreditation Council.

Faculties
College faculties include:
 Bachelor of Arts B.A
Economics, Political Science and Sociology
History, Economics and Political Science
History, Economics and Sociology
History, Political Science and Home Science
History, Sociology and Optional Kannada
Home Science, History and Sociology
Psychology, Sociology and Optional English
 Bachelor of Commerce B.Com
 Bachelor of Science B.Sc
Economics, Mathematics and Statistics
Physics, Mathematics and Computer Science
 Bachelor of Business Administration B.B.A
 Master of Arts in Economics M.A

Principals
 Prof. Vidya D.Nayak (HOD of Economics department)
 Dr S.V.Nayak

Facilities
The college occupies a five-acre campus and provides the following facilities for its students:
 Library
 Canteen
 Gym
 Sports
 Laboratories
I.T. Infrastructure
NCC,NSS, SCOUTS AND GUIDES,RED CROSS

Programs

There is a special program in GFGC Ankola. Daily prayers are held except on Thursdays. A special prayer called "Assembly" is held every Thursday. The National Service Scheme (NSS) is managed by Dr Geeta Nayak, who is the Head of the Commerce Department. NSS  creates awareness among the student community. NSS holds a blood donation camp, First Aid Awareness program, and guest lectures on health and hygiene. Every year, the college organizes NSS camp in rural areas to increase awareness.

Enrollment

College result

References

Universities and colleges in Uttara Kannada district